Dave Mirra Freestyle BMX is a sports video game released in 2000 featuring BMX rider Dave Mirra and other professional BMX riders. It was developed by Z-Axis and published by Acclaim Entertainment under their Acclaim Max Sports label. The game was released on the PlayStation, Game Boy Color, Dreamcast and Microsoft Windows. The player's main objective in the game is to choose one of the riders and work their way through a total of 12 different levels, completing objectives to unlock new equipment.

Gameplay
Following in the footsteps of the Tony Hawk's Pro Skater series, the player holds the assigned Jump button in preparation of performing a trick and releases it to jump. When in the air, Big Air tricks can be performed that can also be "modified" with the aid of the modifier button, or the Big Air button again (modifiers themselves can also be modified). For example, the player jumps from a ramp and performs a Superman (Big Air trick). The game also features ragdoll physics that are featured primarily in the Wipeout multiplayer game mode.

There are a total of four game modes and twelve levels. The first six levels are all challenge based. The player must complete specific goals in order to advance to the next level. The final six levels are competition based, where the player is judged on their performance in a number of timed runs.

Proquest
Proquest is the main mode of the game and could also be called career mode. The player chooses one of the riders and seeks to progress through all the levels of the game in a series of two-minute runs. The first six levels are completed by finishing all the set challenges within them, and the competition levels can only be cleared when the player finishes a run worthy of winning the contest. Once the player finishes each successive level, they will receive new bikes (a total of four extra bikes for each player) and clothing. Upon completion of the game, videos of Dave Mirra and Ryan Nyquist and special cheat codes (depending on the character chosen) are unlocked.

Session
Any unlocked levels can be played here. The player has the same timed runs as in the Proquest mode, but there are no goals to complete, judges to impress or new items to gain. The only real 'objective' of this mode is to improve upon the player's own high score.

Freeride
In this mode, the player can freely ride any level that has been unlocked in the Proquest mode. There is no time limit, so the real aim of the mode is to allow full and unrestricted exploration of the level to find the best spots to score and to practice performing tricks.

2 Player
Note: only the PlayStation and Dreamcast versions have a multiplayer mode.

There are several different multiplayer modes available. Unlike many other similar extreme sports video game titles, the game modes are turn based. As with any other mode, any level unlocked can be played.

Best Run - Each player has a two-minute run to get the highest score.
High Five - This mode involves a series of 30 second runs to see which player can get the highest scoring single trick.
B-M-X - Basically the same as the game mode H-O-R-S-E in the Tony Hawk series—one player does a combination of tricks, and the other player has to gain a higher score than them. Whenever one player fails, they are assigned each successive letter of B-M-X until one player has all the letters and the game finishes.
Random Spot - The game chooses five random spots in the level to perform tricks in. Each player has 15 seconds to perform the highest-scoring single trick at the designated area.
Wipeout - Taking advantage of the ragdoll physics is the Wipeout game mode. Each player takes turns in crashing into objects, trying to score the most points (and bodily harm).
Longest Grind - The player who performs the longest single grind in one run wins.
Highest Wall Tap - The highest wall tap (Jump button + Right direction button) at any spot in the level wins.
Big Air Contest - When players ride up on verts, the height of their jump is measured. Therefore, the aim of this game mode is to get the highest measured "air" up a vert.
Furthest Jump - The player who jumps the furthest wins.
Longest Manual - Jumping and then pressing Down and holding Down again performs a manual (using Up performs a Nose Wheelie). The player with the longest-held manual wins this game mode.

Reception

Garrett Kenyon reviewed the Dreamcast version of the game for Next Generation, rating it three stars out of five, and stated that "this is a bit of a surprise, and an extremely pleasant one".

The PlayStation version of Dave Mirra Freestyle BMX received "favorable" reviews, while the Dreamcast and PC versions received "average" reviews, according to video game review aggregator Metacritic.

Maximum Remix

Jeff Lundrigan reviewed the PlayStation version of the game for Next Generation, rating it three stars out of five, and wrote that "it ain't bad, but if you own Dave Mirra, there aren't a ton of reasons to buy this".

The Maximum Remix version received "average" reviews according to video game review aggregator Metacritic.

References

External links

 

2000 video games
Acclaim Entertainment games
BMX mass media
Cycling video games
Mirra, Dave Freestyle BMX
Dreamcast games
Game Boy Color games
Multiplayer and single-player video games
PlayStation (console) games
RenderWare games
Windows games
Video games developed in the United States